XHHLL-FM is a radio station in Hermosillo, Sonora, Mexico. Broadcasting on 90.7 FM, XHHLL is owned by Grupo Imagen and carries a grupera format known as La Kaliente.

History
XHHLL received its concession on December 11, 1990, and signed on December 21. It was owned by Radio S.A. subsidiary Radio Alma, S.A.; the group launched “Energía Digital”, an adult contemporary format. On September 13, 1993, the station flipped to grupera as "La Kaliente 90.7", a format it maintains to this day. XHHLL was sold to Grupo Imagen in 2006.

The station was authorized in March 2019 to operate in HD Radio and in August 2019 to add Imagen Radio programming as its HD2 subchannel.

References

Radio stations in Sonora
Mass media in Hermosillo
Grupo Imagen